Klipplaat is a town in Sarah Baartman District Municipality in the Eastern Cape province of South Africa.

The town is some 185 km north-west of Port Elizabeth and 75 km south-east of Aberdeen. It takes its name from large slabs of rock on the surface of the ground; from Afrikaans klip: 'stone' or 'rock'; plaat: 'sheet' or 'slab'.

References

Populated places in the Dr Beyers Naudé Local Municipality